Ektu Aalor Khonje (In Search of Light) is an upcoming Indian Bengali-language drama film directed by Bhaskar Banerjee and produced by Curlyvine Films & Productions Pvt Ltd. This debut indie film by director Bhaskar Banerjee explores the question that has plagued humanity since the beginning, the mysteries of life and death, by introducing the audience to the life of a mystic and enlightened soul called Dadathakur staying in disguise in a remote village in West Bengal.

Production was interrupted because of funding problems and it took nearly five years for the film to be completed. The film is shot mainly on location, on a very limited budget, featuring mostly amateur actors, and is made by an inexperienced crew. It was a group of ten people who played every role from cast to crew.

Plot summary
Local holy man  Dadathakur is a teacher and healer, providing guidance and philosophical instruction to generations of villagers and is regarded with great esteem by all who meet him. He is a locus of village wisdom and imparts philosophical guidances from a variety of sources in his effort to explain the vagaries and iniquities of daily life and toil in the village, set in West Bengal.

Yet mystery surrounds his beginnings, and it is Dadathakur's past that film director Banerjee explores in this upcoming indie production. Long before becoming known for village wisdom, Dadathakur was an impoverished writer by the name of Rishob who was married to a young beautiful woman named Manoshi. Due to the dire circumstances and poverty of their early lives, Manoshi dies unexpectedly, leaving Rishob itinerant and without purpose in life. This event scars his soul and causes him to question the material struggle of existence and the importance of life and death in the face of such injustice and complacency on the part of the universe to his sadness.

To rediscover himself and his purpose in this world, Rishob becomes Dadathakur, and moves to Jibanpur village where he learns and perfects his craft and life's wisdom. The film "In Search of Light" (Ektu aalor khonje) begins thirty years into Dadathakur's ministry in the village. Rishob's new life as a holy man is complicated when his son Sourjyo, long lost to him and time, arrives in the village of Jibanpur after receiving reliable word from a family friend that his father Rishob is alive and well, dwelling somewhere in disguise. Dadathakur is once again forced to face questions of life and death as well as the meaning of it all as he confronts his son from a previous life and reveals the secrets of Rishob's past to a man he only has just met, shedding the pretense of Dadathakur to once again become the hobbled man that led him on the path to spiritual enlightenment in the first place.

Cast and crew
The entire film was done by a group of ten people who actually played every role from cast to crew. Though the main cast of Dadathakur is performed by Mahendra Daan, a passionate theatre personality who had been performing on stage for more than sixteen years. His passion and fondness towards acting made him grab the role owing to the brilliance of screenplay. For others namely Debraj Sengupta, Ipsita Moitra, Susmita Bhattacharya, Riya Singh it was more like a learning experience considering that this was their debut feature project.

 Mahendra Daan as Dadathakur
 Pavel Dutta as Rishob
 Ipsita Moitra as Manoshi
 Debraj Sengupta as Sourjyo
 Susmita Bhattacharya as Indrani
 Rana Banerjee as Manik Sarkar
 Kakoli Daan as Manju
 Riya Singh as Komli
 Rohan Banerjee as Kajol
 Prabir Halder as Sonaton

Filming and production
The first phase of shooting started in a village named Belun in Katwa, West Bengal. As for a first time production unit working on such a project in a shoe string budget the entire shoot went more than perfect with all the cooperation and excitement from the entire village and local people. But things turned around and shooting came to a halt after this phase as one of the prominent actor was diagnosed of cancer, a few days later. The actor, Pavel Dutta was a promising exponent in the field and the entire unit lost the zeal as he succumbed to the disease a few months later. The team only regrouped quite sometime later with the motto of leading the project to success with the inclusion of another promising actor in Mahendra Daan. The story and plot had to be modified then to accustom necessary changes in casting. And after some severe and dedicated effort from the entire crew, the second phase of shooting started in Purulia after more than a year. Since then it all went through at regular breaks owing to shortage of funds for shooting. Considering the plot of the story which is mainly set in a remote village it was highly difficult to arrange for traditional village houses where the shoot can be performed. Since the entire filming is preferably done in locations it was a difficult and uphill task of location scouting. Finally the spot was selected in a village in Arambagh which became the destination of Dadathakur the protagonist of the film.

Currently the film is under post production expecting to be released by December 2020. The trailer of the film is expected to be released very shortly.

References

Bengali-language Indian films